Martin Opic (born 28 September 1977) is a Czech football player who currently plays for FC Hlučín.

Opic played in the first qualifying round of the 2003–04 UEFA Champions League, scoring as a substitute in a 1–0 first leg win for FBK Kaunas away to HB Tórshavn. He started the second leg, scoring again in a 4–1 home win.

Opic signed for Hlučín in 2011, arriving from Karviná.

Being originally a professional firefighter, Opic travelled to the World Police and Fire Games in August 2011 to represent the Czech Republic.

References

External links
 Profile at iDNES.cz

Czech footballers
1977 births
Living people
Czech First League players
Bohemians 1905 players
FBK Kaunas footballers
FK Ústí nad Labem players

Association football forwards